The Clark Homestead is a historic house on Madley Road in Lebanon, Connecticut.  Built c. 1708, it is believed to be Lebanon's oldest building.  It was owned in the late 18th century by James Clark, a veteran of the American Revolutionary War.  The house was listed on the National Register of Historic Places on December 1, 1978.

Description and history
It is a -story wood-frame structure, five bays wide, with a side-gable roof, large central chimney, clapboarded exterior, and rear leanto section giving it a classic New England saltbox appearance. An ell, added in the 19th century, extends to the rear. The entrance is at the center of the front facade, with a seven-light transom window and architrave above. The interior follows a typical central chimney plan, with a narrow winding staircase in the entry vestibule and parlor spaces to either side. The north bedroom in particular has a fine fireplace surround with fluted pilasters.

The land the house stands on is a remnant of  purchased in 1700 by Daniel Clark.  His grandson Moses was given the land in 1708, and built the oldest portion of this house soon afterward.  That portion included the central chimney and three bays; it was widened and extended about 1750, probably by Moses's son James, making it five bays wide and adding the leanto.  James Clark was a veteran of the American Revolutionary War, serving at the Battle of Bunker Hill, Battle of White Plains, and other engagements.  He lived to the age of 95, and attended the dedication of the Bunker Hill Monument.

See also
List of the oldest buildings in Connecticut
National Register of Historic Places listings in New London County, Connecticut

References

Houses on the National Register of Historic Places in Connecticut
Houses completed in 1708
Houses in Lebanon, Connecticut
National Register of Historic Places in New London County, Connecticut
1708 establishments in Connecticut